Kazimierz Ostrowski (born February 14, 1917 in Berlin, died July 12, 1999 in Gdynia) was a Polish painter.

Biography
Kazimierz Ostrowski was born on February 14, 1917  in Berlin. In 1920 his family moved to Poznań. In 1934 Ostrowski left for Gdynia where together with his brother Zygmunt he painted signs and names of ships (among others SS Kościuszko and MS Batory). 
After World War II in 1945 he reported together with his father and two brothers to the Urban Office in Gdynia where he was given the task of changing the street names and signs on the buildings of State institutions. 
In the same year he began his painting studies at the Academy of the Fine Arts in Sopot. 
In 1949 he received a scholarship from the French government to study in Paris where he apprenticed to the famous French painter Fernand Léger. In 1950 he came back to Gdynia and married Halina Krywald, with whom he had two children. 
From 1964 to 1987 he was professor in the painting atelier at the Academy of Fine Arts in Gdańsk. In October 1981 he received the title of associate professor.

Kazimierz Ostrowski presented his paintings on more than 60 individual and collective exhibitions. He was awarded with approximately 20 different awards.

Honors 

1957 – First prize for painting in the First Exhibition of Polish young painting, sculpture and graphics
1959 – Artistic award of the city of Gdynia
1970 – Golden Cross of Merit
1974 – Commemorative medal for his efforts for the city from the MRN Presidium in Gdynia
1974 – Award of the President of the City of Gdynia for the entirety of his creative work
1976 – Medal from the Mayor of the City of Gdynia on the occasion of the 50th anniversary of the city
1982 – First prize of the Ministries of Culture and Arts
1985 – First prize of PWSSP-Vice-chancellor in Gdańsk
1988 – Officers’ Cross of the Order of Polonia Restituta
1991 – Award from the District of Gdańsk for his work as an outstanding artistic teacher
1995 – Artistic award of the Mayor of the City of Gdynia

On July 12, 1999 Ostrowski died in his flat-atelier in 62 Abrahama Street in Gdynia. On the facade of the building a commemorative bronze plate was uncovered October 26, 2006.

1917 births
1999 deaths
20th-century Polish painters
20th-century Polish male artists
People from Gdynia
Officers of the Order of Polonia Restituta
Recipients of the Gold Cross of Merit (Poland)
People from West Prussia
Polish male painters
Academic staff of the Academy of Fine Arts in Gdańsk